, also known as , is spoken by the Karajá people in some thirty villages in central Brazil.

There are distinct male and female forms of speech; one of the principal differences is that men drop the sound , which is pronounced by women.

Karaja is a verb-final language, with simple noun and more complex verbal morphology that includes noun incorporation. Verbs inflect for direction as well as person, mood, object, and voice.

Dialects
Dialects are Northern Karajá, Southern Karajá, Xambioá, and Javaé.

Karajá proper is spoken on the main course of the Araguaia River in and around Bananal Island. Phonologically, it is set apart from the other dialects (Javaé and Xambioá) by the occurrence of the vowel /ə/ (not represented in the orthography), which corresponds to a full vowel in Javaé and Xambioá whose quality is a copy of the vowel of the next syllable. For example, Karajá  // ‘honey’,  // ‘causative suffix’,  // ‘to tie’,  // ‘banzeiro’,  // ‘termite’,  // ‘gourd’ correspond to Javaé and Xambioá  //,  //,  //,  //,  //,  //.

Karajá proper is further subdivided into Northern and Southern Karajá. Southern Karajá is spoken in the Fontoura village and further to the south, whereas Northern Karajá is spoken in the São Domingos village and further to the north. There are few differences between Northern and Southern Karajá. Examples of lexical differences include N(orthern)  / S(outhern)  ‘I’, N  / S  ‘song.♂’, N  / S  ‘prostitute’, N  / S  ‘pirarucu fish’, N  / S  ‘clay pot’, N  / S  ‘curassow’, and other word pairs. Northern Karajá also differs from Southern Karajá in using different habitual markers for different persons (first person , second person , third person ), whereas Southern Karajá uses  for all three persons. In addition, there is a difference regarding the occurrence of the centripetal prefix (n- or d-, phonologically /d-/) in the first person of the realis mood. In Northern Karajá (just like in Javaé and Xambioá), it occurs only once, after the first person prefix:  ‘I brought it’. In Southern Karajá, it occurs twice, both before and after the person prefix:  ‘I brought it’.

Javaé is currently spoken by the Javaés River, a smaller branch of the Araguaia, though historically the Javaé inhabited the interior of the Bananal island, until at least the first half of the 20th century. Javaé has more Apyãwa loans than other Karajá dialects. In addition, Javaé has less genderlectal differences than Karajá and Xambioá, as in many cases the Javaé women systematically use forms that are restricted to the male genderlect in other dialects.

Xambioá is spoken on the east bank of the Araguaia, close to the mouth of the Maria River (a western tributary of the Araguaia), which makes it the northernmost variety of Karajá. Ribeiro (2012) reports that there were only 8 fluent speakers in 1998, all of them elderly. Some Xambioá words are not found in other dialects, such as the Língua Geral Amazônica borrowing  ‘paper’ (in Karajá and Javaé, the term for ‘skin, bark, cloth’ is used instead: Karajá ♀ , Javaé ♀ , Karajá/Javaé ♂ ).

Phonology
Karajá has thirteen oral vowels, and three nasal vowels, .

This language has ATR vowel harmony which causes the non-ATR vowels  to become more tense by the influence of a ATR vowel (one of ) located further to the right. The vowels  are opaque. Note that  undergo the harmony in an iterative manner (as in  → /ɾeɾoɾe/ ‘I ate it’), whether  may optionally block the further spread of the [+ATR] feature:  or  ‘I drove it away’.

V → [+ATR] / _ (C)-V[+ATR]

The chart below contains the sounds used in Karajá.

The consonants  are palatalized to  when adjacent to [+ATR] high vowels. Consonants  have nasal allophones  when occurring before . In fact, almost all occurrences of  can be explained by the operation of these two processes; for these reason, Ribeiro (2012) argues that  have no phonemic status. Under this analysis, Karajá has only twelve consonant phonemes, eight of which are coronal. The chart below illustrates the phonemic inventory of Karajá assuming  are not phonemic.

Men's and women's speech
Note that men maintain  in at least one grammatical ending.

The first (Northern Karajá, Javaé, Xambioá: ♀  ; Southern Karajá: ♀  ) and third (♂ optional male form) person pronouns differ based on gender of the speaker, but the second person pronoun   is an exception to this rule, and is pronounced the same by men and women.

It is hypothesized (Ribeiro 2012) that in the past this process of the k-drop became a sign of masculinity and females resisted it in order to keep a more conservative form of speech.

Morphology

Verb
The verb in Karajá grammar always agrees with the subject of the sentence, as it does in French for example; these agreements are determined by the past and present tense (also known as realis) or future, potential, and admonitory tenses (also known as irrealis). Verbs have no lexical opposites (such as in vs. out) and direction is represented through inflection; all Karajá verbs can inflect for direction. Verbs are either transitive or intransitive and the valence of each verb, therefore, may increase or decrease depending on their status as transitive or intransitive.

Noun
Nouns can be incorporated into verbs to create noun-verb compounds with the noun being placed into the verb. Any noun can be turned into a verb with the use of a suffix and action nouns can be created with the use of the verb stem.

Pronoun
There are three personal pronouns:

 First person (‘I’): ♀  , ♂   (Southern Karajá: ♀  , ♂  )

 Second person (‘you’):  

 Third person (‘he/she/it’):   (♂ optional male form)

 These pronouns can be pluralized with the use of the pluralizer . When pluralized, the first person plural has both an inclusive and exclusive interpretation as in the following examples:

Possessive pronouns are not used but are instead marked by affixes (ie.  = ‘my’) and there are three demonstrative pronouns:

  - ‘this’
  - ‘that (close to the addressee)’
  - ‘that (distant from both the speaker and the addressee)’

Direction

Direction in the Karajá language does not have any lexical opposites, such as in and out or go and come. Direction, rather, is marked by a set of prefixes that determine whether the event in the sentence is happening away from or toward the speaker. Centrifugal direction (away from the speaker) is characterized by means of the prefix r- while centripetal direction (toward the speaker) is characterized by means of the prefix d-. All the verbs in the Karajá language — even those that do not convey the semantics of movement — obligatorily inflect for direction.

 Centrifugal:

 Centripetal:

Syntax

Valence
Karajá language is characterized both by the reduction of valence and by the increase in valence. Valence increase happens through causitivization and through oblique promotion while valence decrease happens through reflixivatization, passivization, and antipassivization (Ribeiro 2012).

Valence increase
Unergative verbs may be causativized by means of suffixing the causativizer suffix  plus the verbalizer suffix  to the nominalized verb. In the example below, the verb  ‘to walk’ is first nominalized by means of the process of consonantal replacement, yielding , and then causativized.

The man in this example is the causer who makes the child, the causee, walk.

Valence-decreasing morphology
In Karajá, it is possible to demote a patient of a transitive verb to peripheral status by means of the antipassive prefix :

In these examples, the patient is coreferential with the agent (that is, they refer to the same individual).

Passivization
Passives are described as the change of a clause from a transitive to an intransitive sentence through the demotion of the subject. Passive verbs are marked either by the prefix  (or by its zero allomorph  in the vowel-initial stems that belong to the so called ɗ-class):

Here, the subject ‘mother’ is demoted in the second example.

Number
When referring to nouns, plurality is expressed through three processes: reduplication, the pluralizer , and the use of the noun  ‘people, group’. In verbs, plurality is marked through the use of the pluralizer .

Reduplication
Reduplication refers to the repetition of word categories to convey a certain meaning. In the case of the Karajá language, reduplication occurs with nouns and is used to convey plurality:

Pluralizer 
The pluralizer  is used to pluralize the three personal pronouns:

	
In addition, the latter example shows how the pluralizer , when combined with the noun for people, functions as a first person plural inclusive pronoun to include those outside of a specific group. According to Ribeiro,  serves the same function as the phrase , commonly found in Brazilian Portuguese.

In contrast to the pluralizer , the noun word  is not used with pronouns but rather functions as a noun to pluralize a group of people, as shown in the following example:

Pluralizer 
As mentioned above, the pluralizer  functions to pluralize verbs as shown in the following example:

‘Came’, in this example, is pluralized to indicate that many individuals came.

Vocabulary

Language contact
Ribeiro (2012) finds a number of Apyãwa loanwords in Karajá (such as  ‘carrying basket’,   ’beans’,  ‘macaw (sp.)’,  ‘parakeet (sp.)’,  ‘Txakohi ceremonial mask’,  ‘garbage (Javaé dialect)’) as well as several Karajá loans in Apyãwa ( ‘banana’,  ‘White man’,  ‘turtle stew’,  ‘Irabure ceremonial mask’), Parakanã, and Asuriní of Trocará ( ‘banana’,  ‘White man’). Some loans from one of the Língua Geral varieties (Língua Geral Paulista or Língua Geral Amazônica) have also been found, including  ‘salt’,  ‘firearm’,  ‘hoe’,  ‘beans’,  ‘paper (Xambioá dialect)’,  ‘money (dated)’).

Karajá has also contacted with the distantly related Mẽbêngôkre language. Ribeiro (2012) identifies a number of Karajá loanwords in Mẽbêngôkre, especially in the dialect spoken by the Xikrin group; the source of these loanwords is thought to be the Xambioá dialect.

Loanwords from Brazilian Portuguese, such as  ‘money’ and  ‘suit, jacket’ (from), are also found.

Jolkesky (2016) notes that there are lexical similarities with the Karib, Puinave-Nadahup, and Tupi language families due to contact.

Sample vocabulary
Loukotka (1968) lists the following basic vocabulary items for Karajá and Javajé.

{| class="wikitable sortable"
! gloss !! Karajá !! Javajé
|-
! one
| dohodzyi || zohódi
|-
! two
| inati || ináti
|-
! three
| inatanga || nádo
|-
! head
| wa-ara || rahah
|-
! ear
| noʔonti || nóhonti
|-
! tooth
| wa-idzyu || zyuʔú
|-
! woman
| hanökö || uãuoːkoː
|-
! water
| bé || bää
|-
! stone
| máma || mená
|-
! maize
| mahi || diulad'ié
|-
! tapir
| kaongri || konrí
|}

Notes

References
 Fortune, David & Fortune, Gretchen (1963). The phonemes of the Karajá language (manuscript). Rio de Janeiro: Arquivo Lingüístico do Museu Nacional.
 Museo do Índio (2016). Karajá/Iny. Retrieved from http://prodoclin.museudoindio.gov.br/index.php/etnias/karaja
 Ribeiro, Eduard Rivail. (2000) "[ATR] vowel harmony and palatalization in Karajá". Santa Barbara Papers in Linguistics. 10: Proceedings of  2000. pp. 80–89.
 Ribeiro, Eduardo Rivail. (2002) "Direction in Karajá". In Rosa María Ortiz Ciscomani, ed., Vi encuentro internacional de lingüística en el noroeste.
 Ribeiro, Eduardo (2012). A Grammar of Karajá. University of Chicago, Chicago.
 Rodrigues, Aryon D. (1999) "Macro-Jê". In R. M. W. Dixon and Alexandra Y. Aikhenvald (eds.), The Amazonian Languages. Cambridge Language Surveys. Cambridge: Cambridge University Press.

External links
 https://web.archive.org/web/20060320120656/http://indian-cultures.com/Cultures/karaja.html
Alain Fabre, 2005, Diccionario etnolingüístico y guía bibliográfica de los pueblos indígenas sudamericanos: KARAJÁ
Karajá (Intercontinental Dictionary Series)

Nuclear Macro-Jê languages
Indigenous languages of Central Amazonia
Languages of Brazil